Rex Lee (born January 7, 1969) is an American actor. He is best known for his role as Lloyd Lee in the HBO series Entourage and his role as Elliot Park in the television sitcom Young & Hungry.

Early life
Lee spent his childhood in Massachusetts cities of Somerville, Woburn, and Newton. He graduated from the Oberlin Conservatory of Music in 1990. Although Lee was studying to be a professional pianist, he decided he wanted to act after taking a theater class in college.

Career
Prior to landing the role on Entourage, Lee had various jobs including performing in the children's theater company, Imagination Company, as well as working as a casting assistant. He was the casting director for the TV movie The Cure for a Diseased Life.  Lee has also played roles on a variety of TV shows, including Twins, What About Brian and Maurice on two episodes of Zoey 101.

Lee played Lloyd Lee, the gay assistant to Ari Gold, the character played by Jeremy Piven  eventually becoming an agent and interim head of TMA's television department. Lee began his role in the first episode of the show's second season, "The Boys Are Back in Town", which introduced Lloyd as the replacement to Ari's previous assistant. Lee won the award for Outstanding Supporting Actor, Television at the AZN Asian Excellence Awards in 2007 and 2008.

Lee had a series regular role in the first two seasons of the ABC sitcom Suburgatory, playing Mr. Wolfe, a clueless high school guidance counselor.
He appeared as one of the judges at Nationals in the Fox Television Comedy-Drama Glee in season 3. In 2014, he had a starring role in the ABC Family (later rebranded as Freeform) television sitcom Young & Hungry where he plays Elliot Park, the publicist and "right-hand man" to a young tech entrepreneur named Josh. Young & Hungry ran for five seasons, concluding in 2018.

In 2015, Lee appeared in an episode of Fresh Off the Boat as Jessica Huang's college boyfriend, Oscar Chow. Lee currently plays a talent agent in the 2015 "#ItsThatEasy" celebrity-themed ad campaign for website company Wix.com.

Personal life
Lee is gay; he came out to his parents when he was 22.

In an interview from 2011, Lee said that he was single and looking for something permanent, but that it was difficult to find the right relationship.

Filmography

Film

Television

References

 Rex Lee on the Return of Entourage
 A Quickie with Rex Lee on PopGurls.com
 Entertainment Weekly interview with Rex Lee and the actors who portray TV assistants Kenneth ("30 Rock") and Marc

External links
 

1969 births
Male actors from California
Male actors from Ohio
American male film actors
American male television actors
American gay actors
Living people
Oberlin College alumni
People from Warren, Ohio
American male actors of Korean descent
21st-century American male actors
Male actors from Massachusetts
20th-century American male actors
American LGBT people of Asian descent
LGBT people from Ohio
Servite High School alumni